David Heidenreich (born 24 June 2000) is a Czech professional footballer who plays as a defender for Jablonec, on loan from Atalanta.

Career
On 24 August 2021 he joined SPAL on loan. On 16 July 2022 Heidenreich joined Jablonec on a one-year loan.

References

External links

2000 births
Living people
Czech footballers
Association football defenders
Atalanta B.C. players
FK Teplice players
S.P.A.L. players
Czech First League players
Czech expatriate footballers
Expatriate footballers in Italy
FK Jablonec players
Serie B players
Czech expatriate sportspeople in Italy